Freyung may refer to:

 Freyung, Bavaria, a town in Germany
 Freyung-Grafenau, a district in Bavaria, Germany
 Freyung, Vienna, a public square in Austria

See also
 Passau–Freyung railway, a branch line in Bavaria, Germany